"Quiero Que Me Hagas el Amor" ("I Want You to Make Love to Me") is a song written by Luis Ángel Márquez and performed by Puerto Rican singer Ednita Nazario on her album Pasiones (1994). Ramiro Burr of the San Antonio Express-News called it "provocative".  It became her first number-one song on the Billboard Latin Pop Airplay chart. A live version of the song was included on her album Acústico Vol. II (2002). The song has been covered by Ray López, Ricky and Diana, and Johnny Ray.

Charts

See also
List of number-one Billboard Latin Pop Airplay songs of 1994

References

1994 singles
1994 songs
Ednita Nazario songs
1990s ballads
Pop ballads
Song recordings produced by K. C. Porter
Spanish-language songs